Eva Skalníková (born January 15, 1985) is a Czech cross country skier who competed between 2002 and 2011. At the 2010 Winter Olympics in Vancouver, she finished 13th in the 4 × 5 km relay and 48th in the 30 km event.

At the FIS Nordic World Ski Championships 2009 in Liberec, Skalníková finished 13th in the 4 × 5 km relay, 45th in the 10 km, and 50th in the 7.5 km + 7.5 km double pursuit.

Her best World Cup individual finish was 42nd in a 5 km event in the Czech Republic in 2002.

Cross-country skiing results
All results are sourced from the International Ski Federation (FIS).

Olympic Games

World Championships

World Cup

Season standings

References

External links

1985 births
Cross-country skiers at the 2010 Winter Olympics
Czech female cross-country skiers
Living people
Olympic cross-country skiers of the Czech Republic
People from Nové Město na Moravě
Sportspeople from the Vysočina Region